JOLX-DTV, virtual channel 6 (UHF digital channel 22), branded as  is the Chūbu region flagship station of the All-Nippon News Network, owned by the , with its headquarters in Nagoya.  It is broadcast in Aichi Prefecture, Gifu Prefecture, and Mie Prefecture. 

The station is well known among anime fans for its close association with the anime studio Sunrise (now known as Bandai Namco Filmworks), including participating in the production of such works as Mobile Suit Gundam, Zambot 3 (and its successor Daitarn 3), and Yoroiden Samurai Troopers.

History

Prior launch 
The license for channel 11 in the Tōkai region began its search on November 24, 1959. One of the applicants for the broadcast license was Shotaro Kamiya, the then-president of Toyota Motors Sales Division. At that time there were an initial total of 9 companies which was later reduced to 5 companies (after the other 4 companies agreed to merge under the name of Chūkyō Television Broadcasting). On July 14, 1961, the Ministry of Posts (current Ministry of Internal Affairs and Communications) awarded the license to Chukyo TV being designated on channel 11. 

The broadcaster was founded on September 6, 1961. On November 25, 1961, the company was renamed to Nagoya Broadcasting Network. Prior to its official broadcast, there were only two commercial broadcasters in the Tokai region: CBC (which is part of JNN) and Tokai TV (which is part of FNN and NNN). Nagoya TV then decided to become part of the Nippon TV and NET TV (current TV Asahi), which resulted from Tokai TV to become a full-time FNN affiliate.

The first tests (still under the Chūkyō name) were held on March 10, 1962. Eventually, service tests were conducted on March 25 and regular transmissions commenced on April 1.

Initially, the station was affiliated to two networks: NTV and NET (the current TV Asahi). It was one of the founding members of the Nippon News Network in 1966. Color transmissions began in December of that year. The station became a sole affiliate of NNN when Chūkyō TV began broadcasting on April 1, 1969.

When CTV began to show interest in joining NNN in 1972, NBN gradually introduced ANN network programming. The network switch wasn't officialized until April 1, 1973.

Bi-lingual transmissions commenced in 1986. The following year, the station adopted the Nagoya TV branding.

The current brand, Mētele (メーテレ Mētere''), and hybrid sheep-wolf mascot (Wolfy) were introduced on April 1, 2003.

Stations

AnalogJOLX-TVNagoya TV Tower - Channel 11
Toyohashi - Channel 60
Takayama - Channel 12
Gujo-Hachiman - Channel 6
Nabari - Channel 56
Toba - Channel 4
Ise - Channel 61
Owase - Channel 10
Kumano - Channel 11, etc.

DigitalJOLX-DTV''' (LX, 旧NBN)
Remote Controller ID 6
Nagoya (Seto Digital Tower) -  Channel 22
Toyohashi, Chuno, Nakatsugawa, Takayama and Ise - Channel 14
Nabari - Channel 37

Programmes

Now on air

Regional (in Aichi Prefecture, Gifu Prefecture, and Mie Prefecture)
Dodesuka! (どですか!) - local news program
Summers Guerrillappa (さまぁ~ずげりらっパ) - a variety show by Summers

National
Udo-chan no Tabishite Gomen (ウドちゃんの旅してゴメン) - a tourism guide program by Udo Suzuki
Fūfu Kōkan Variety Love Change (夫婦交換バラエティー ラブちぇん) - a late-night documentary show
Battle Spirits (バトルスピリッツ) series

Past

Regional
Mētele Wide Super J Channel (メ~テレワイドスーパーJチャンネル)

National

Invincible Super Man Zambot 3 (無敵超人ザンボット3)
Invincible Steel Man Daitarn 3 (無敵鋼人ダイターン3)
Mobile Suit Gundam (機動戦士ガンダム)
Invincible Robo Trider G7 (無敵ロボトライダーG7)
Saikyō Robo Daiōja (最強ロボ ダイオージャ)
Combat Mecha Xabungle (戦闘メカ ザブングル)
Aura Battler Dunbine (聖戦士ダンバイン)
Heavy Metal L-Gaim (重戦機エルガイム)
Chōriki Robo Galatt (超力ロボ ガラット)
Mobile Suit Zeta Gundam (機動戦士Ζガンダム)
Mobile Suit Gundam ZZ (機動戦士ガンダムΖΖ)
Metal Armor Dragonar (機甲戦記ドラグナー)
Ulysses 31 (宇宙伝説ユリシーズ31)
Ronin Warriors (鎧伝サムライトルーパー)
Jushin Liger (獣神ライガー)
Brave series (勇者シリーズ)
Bomberman B-Daman Bakugaiden (Bビーダマン爆外伝)
Bomberman B-Daman Bakugaiden V (Bビーダマン爆外伝V)
Mighty Cat Masked Niyander (ニャニがニャンだー ニャンダーかめん)
Gekito! Crush Gear Turbo (激闘!クラッシュギアTURBO)
Crush Gear Nitro (クラッシュギアNitro)
Kaiketsu Zorori (かいけつゾロリ)
Majime ni Fumajime Kaiketsu Zorori (まじめにふまじめ かいけつゾロリ)
Black Lagoon (BLACK LAGOON)
Kodai Ōja Kyōryū King: D Kidz Adventure (古代王者恐竜キング Dキッズ・アドベンチャー) - anime television series

Other TV stations in Nagoya
Tōkai Television Broadcasting (THK, affiliated with CX and FNN / FNS) - 1
Chūkyō Television Broadcasting (CTV, affiliated with NTV and NNN / NNS) - 4
Chubu-Nippon Broadcasting Co.,Ltd (CBC, affiliated with TBS TV and JNN) - 5
Television Broadcasting of Aichi (TVA, affiliated with TV Tokyo and TX Network) - 10

References

External links
http://nagoyatv.com - Official website of Natele

All-Nippon News Network
Television stations in Nagoya
Television channels and stations established in 1962
Asahi Shimbun Company
1962 establishments in Japan
Companies based in Nagoya
Mass media in Nagoya